Silvington is a village and former civil parish, now in the parish of Wheathill, in the Shropshire district, in the ceremonial county of Shropshire, England. The church is dedicated to Saint Michael and is in the Diocese of Hereford. In 1961 the parish had a population of 29.

History 
On 1 April 1967 the parish was abolished and merged with Wheathill.

See also
Listed buildings in Wheathill

References 

Villages in Shropshire
Former civil parishes in Shropshire